North Scituate is a census-designated place (CDP) in the town of Scituate in Plymouth County, Massachusetts, United States. The population was 5,077 at the 2010 census. It was formerly known as Gannet Corner.

Geography
North Scituate is located at  (42.212308, −70.766478).

According to the United States Census Bureau, the CDP has a total area of 10.1 km (3.9 mi), of which 10.0 km (3.9 mi) is land and 0.1 km (0.1 mi) (1.28%) is water.

The word "Scituate" is derived from the Native American word satuit, meaning "cold brook", referring to the river that runs into Scituate Harbor.

North Scituate has one freshwater pond, Hunter's Pond, which is fed by Bound Brook. Hunter's Pond flows into the saltwater Gulph River via a waterfall at Mordecai Lincoln Road.

Direct train service from North Scituate into Boston is available from North Scituate station on the Greenbush Line of MBTA Commuter Rail.

Demographics

As of the census of 2000, there were 5,065 people, 1,849 households, and 1,432 families residing in the CDP. The population density was 505.3/km (1,310.4/mi). There were 1,901 housing units at an average density of 189.7/km (491.8/mi). The racial makeup of the CDP was 97.81% White, 0.22% African American, 0.04% Native American, 0.41% Asian, 0.04% Pacific Islander, 0.93% from other races, and 0.55% from two or more races. Hispanic or Latino of any race were 0.95% of the population.

There were 1,849 households, out of which 36.7% had children under the age of 18 living with them, 67.8% were married couples living together, 7.8% had a female householder with no husband present, and 22.5% were non-families. 19.9% of all households were made up of individuals, and 10.5% had someone living alone who was 65 years of age or older. The average household size was 2.74 and the average family size was 3.18.

In the CDP, the population was spread out, with 27.5% under the age of 18, 4.0% from 18 to 24, 27.0% from 25 to 44, 25.8% from 45 to 64, and 15.7% who were 65 years of age or older. The median age was 40 years. For every 100 females, there were 94.1 males. For every 100 females age 18 and over, there were 87.8 males.

The median income for a household in the CDP was $79,556, and the median income for a family was $92,074. (These figures had risen to $90,082 and $116,263 respectively as of a 2010 estimate). Males had a median income of $65,385 versus $43,839 for females. The per capita income for the CDP was $32,098. About 1.4% of families and 2.3% of the population were below the poverty line, including 0.8% of those under age 18 and 6.8% of those age 65 or over.

References

Census-designated places in Plymouth County, Massachusetts
Scituate, Massachusetts
Census-designated places in Massachusetts